The 1986 Chicago Cubs season was the 115th season of the Chicago Cubs franchise, the 111th in the National League and the 71st at Wrigley Field. The Cubs finished fifth in the National League East with a record of 70–90.

Offseason
 November 9, 1985: Ced Landrum was signed as an amateur free agent by the Cubs.
 December 11, 1985: Dave Owen was traded by the Cubs to the San Francisco Giants for Manny Trillo.
 December 20, 1985: Derek Botelho was released by the Chicago Cubs.
 January 13, 1986: Larry Whitford (minors) and Rich Rembielak (minors) were traded by the Cubs to the Milwaukee Brewers for Mike Martin.
 January 14, 1986: Jerome Walton was drafted by the Cubs in the 2nd round of the 1986 Major League Baseball draft. Player signed May 12, 1986.
 January 15, 1986: Steve Christmas was signed as a free agent by the Cubs.
 January 17, 1986: Gary Jones (minors) and John Cox (minors) were traded by the Cubs to the Oakland Athletics for Phil Stephenson and Bob Bathe (minors).
 February 1, 1986: Matt Keough was signed as a free agent by the Cubs.

Regular season

Season standings

Record vs. opponents

Opening Day starters
Jody Davis
Brian Dayett
Bob Dernier
Shawon Dunston
Leon Durham
Keith Moreland
Ryne Sandberg
Rick Sutcliffe
Manny Trillo

Notable transactions
 May 2, 1986: Terry Francona was signed as a free agent by the Cubs.
 June 14, 1986: Matt Keough was released by the Cubs.
 July 15, 1986: Steve Lake was released by the Cubs.

Roster

Player stats

Batting

Starters by position
Note: Pos = Position; G = Games played; AB = At bats; H = Hits; Avg. = Batting average; HR = Home runs; RBI = Runs batted in

Other batters
Note: G = Games played; AB = At bats; H = Hits; Avg. = Batting average; HR = Home runs; RBI = Runs batted in

Pitching

Starting pitchers
Note: G = Games pitched; IP = Innings pitched; W = Wins; L = Losses; ERA = Earned run average; SO = Strikeouts

Other pitchers
Note: G = Games pitched; IP = Innings pitched; W = Wins; L = Losses; ERA = Earned run average; SO = Strikeouts

Relief pitchers
Note: G = Games pitched; W = Wins; L = Losses; SV = Saves; ERA = Earned run average; SO = Strikeouts

Farm system 

LEAGUE CHAMPIONS: Winston-Salem

References

1986 Chicago Cubs season at Baseball Reference

Chicago Cubs seasons
Chicago Cubs season
Chicago